The 2015 Taunton Deane Borough Council election took place on 7 May 2015 to elect all members (councillors) of Taunton Deane Borough Council in Somerset, England. The council changed from being under no overall control to a Conservative majority having won 36 seats, while local Liberal Democrats took by keeping existing seats 14. Labour candidates won two seats, and the UK Independence Party won one, with the three remaining held by Independent candidates.

After the 2011 elections, the council was under no overall control, with the Conservatives having 28 seats, exactly half, while the Liberal Democrats  took 23. The remaining five seats were split between Labour and Independents councillors.

Results

References

2015
2010s in Somerset
2015 English local elections
May 2015 events in the United Kingdom